Stephen Rex Porter (1931-2003), was a male athlete who competed for England.

Athletics career
He represented England in the pole vault at the 1958 British Empire and Commonwealth Games in Cardiff, Wales.

Four years later he competed in the pole vault again at the 1962 British Empire and Commonwealth Games in Perth, Australia.

References

1931 births
2003 deaths
English male pole vaulters
Athletes (track and field) at the 1958 British Empire and Commonwealth Games
Commonwealth Games competitors for England